"Carry That Weight" is a song by the English rock band the Beatles from their 1969 album Abbey Road. Written by Paul McCartney and credited to Lennon–McCartney, it is the seventh and penultimate song in the album's climactic side-two medley. It features unison vocals in the chorus from all four Beatles, a rarity in their songs. It is preceded by "Golden Slumbers" and segues into "The End".

The middle bridge—featuring brass instruments, electric guitar, and vocals—reprises the beginning of "You Never Give Me Your Money", but with different lyrics. The ending also reprises the arpeggiated guitar motif from the end of that track.

Interpretation
Music critic Ian MacDonald interpreted the lyrics as an acknowledgement by the group that nothing they would do as individual artists would equal what they had achieved together, and they would always carry the weight of their Beatle past. McCartney said the song was about the Beatles' business difficulties and the atmosphere at Apple at the time. In the film Imagine: John Lennon, Lennon says that McCartney was "singing about all of us".

Recording
McCartney introduced the Beatles to "Carry That Weight" in the Twickenham Studios sessions. On January 6, 1969, McCartney proposed his unfinished composition as a light-hearted song for Ringo to sing, patterned after the song "Act Naturally," which Ringo sang on Help! in the UK and Yesterday and Today in the USA. 

The Beatles began recording "Golden Slumbers"/"Carry That Weight" as one piece on 2 July 1969. McCartney, Harrison, and Ringo Starr recorded 15 takes of the two songs while Lennon was in a hospital recovering from a car accident in Scotland.

The rhythm tracks featured McCartney on piano, Harrison on bass guitar, and Starr on drums. The best takes were deemed to be takes 13 and 15, which were edited together on 3 July. That day and the next, McCartney overdubbed his lead vocals and rhythm guitar, Harrison added lead guitar, and all three sang the chorus.

On 30 July, they added more vocals, including Lennon, who had rejoined the sessions on 9 July. More vocals, timpani, and drums were overdubbed on 31 July. The orchestra that marked 30 musicians altogether was recorded on 15 August.

Personnel
According to Ian MacDonald and Mark Lewisohn (who is unsure whether Starr or McCartney played timpani):

The Beatles
 Paul McCartney – lead vocal, piano, rhythm guitar, chorus vocal
 John Lennon – chorus vocal
 George Harrison – 6-string bass guitar, lead guitar, chorus vocal
 Ringo Starr – drums, chorus vocal, timpani
Additional musicians
 Uncredited – twelve violins, four violas, four cellos, double bass, four horns, three trumpets, trombone, bass trombone
 George Martin – orchestral arrangement

Cover versions

 In 1972, Melbourne-based Australian pop singer Colleen Hewett had a hit on the Australian singles chart with her cover of the song, and her interpretation had both the song and sections of "Golden Slumbers".
 In 1976, the Bee Gees covered the song for the musical documentary All This and World War II. Two years later, they did the same for the movie version of Sgt. Pepper's Lonely Hearts Club Band.
American singer Judy Collins covered the song on her 2007 album Judy Collins Sings Lennon and McCartney.

Notes

References

External links

1960s ballads
1969 songs
1972 singles
The Beatles songs
Colleen Hewett songs
Song recordings produced by George Martin
Rock ballads
Songs written by Lennon–McCartney
Songs published by Northern Songs